Rineloricaria pentamaculata is a species of catfish in the family Loricariidae. It is native to South America, where it occurs in the Turvo River basin in the state of São Paulo in Brazil, with its type locality being listed as near Ourinhos. The species is believed to be a facultative air-breather.

References 

Loricariini
Fish described in 1994
Catfish of South America
Freshwater fish of Brazil